Havens department store is a Grade II listed building based in Westcliff-on-Sea, Essex and, until its closure in 2017, was the only remaining independent department store based in the borough of Southend-on-Sea.

History
Havens was opened in 1901 by Rawdon Havens as a specialist retailers of China Tableware and Crystal Glass in Hamlet Court Road, Westcliff.

The current store was opened in 1935 and was listed as Grade II in 2016.

In May 2017, Nigel Haven announced that the store would be closing and moving to an online retailer only. The building was rented to Age Concern as a community hub.

References

Department stores in Southend-On-Sea (town)
Department stores of the United Kingdom
Defunct retail companies of the United Kingdom
Defunct department stores of the United Kingdom
Buildings and structures in Southend-on-Sea
Retail companies established in 1901
1901 establishments in England
Department store buildings in the United Kingdom
Grade II listed buildings in Essex